Shaun Baxter is a former association football player who represented New Zealand at international level.
Baxter scored his only international goal on his full All Whites debut in a 5–1 win over Kuwait on 16 October 1980 and ended his international playing career with seven A-international caps to his credit, his final cap an appearance in a 0–2 loss to Malaysia on 30 October that same year.

References 

Year of birth missing (living people)
Living people
Manurewa AFC players
New Zealand association footballers
New Zealand international footballers
Association football defenders